Patrick Joseph Bumatay (born February 14, 1978) is an American lawyer and jurist who serves as a U.S. circuit judge of the U.S. Court of Appeals for the Ninth Circuit.

Early life and education 
Bumatay was born in 1978 in Secaucus, New Jersey. He graduated from Yale University in 2000 with a Bachelor of Arts, cum laude. He spent three years as a political campaign staffer and as a paralegal in the Executive Office of the President of the United States. He then attended Harvard Law School, where he was an editor of the Harvard Journal of Law and Public Policy. He graduated in 2006 with a Juris Doctor.

Early career

After graduating from law school, Bumatay was a law clerk to Judge Timothy Tymkovich of the U.S. Court of Appeals for the Tenth Circuit from 2006 to 2007. He was a special assistant in the U.S. Department of Justice's Office of Legal Policy from 2007 to 2008 and Office of the Associate Attorney General from 2008 to 2009. He then clerked for Judge Sandra L. Townes of the U.S. District Court for the Eastern District of New York from 2009 to 2010.

From 2010 to 2012, Bumatay was in private practice as an associate at the New York City law firm Morvillo Abramowitz Grand Iason & Anello. From 2012 until his judicial appointment in 2018, Bumatay was a federal prosecutor for the Southern District of California in the San Diego office, where he was a member of the Organized Crime and Drug Enforcement Task Forces Section.

He has been a member of the Federalist Society since 2003, the Federal Bar Association (San Diego chapter) since 2016, the National Asian Pacific American Bar Association in 2015 and again since 2018, the National Filipino American Lawyers Association from 2017 to 2018, and the Tom Homann LGBT Law Association since 2017.

Federal judicial service

Court of appeals 
On October 10, 2018, President Donald Trump announced his intent to nominate Bumatay to serve as a United States Circuit Judge of the United States Court of Appeals for the Ninth Circuit. Both U.S. Senators from California, Dianne Feinstein and Kamala Harris, announced their opposition to his nomination, saying they had not included Bumatay's name among those they recommended for the 9th Circuit. On November 13, 2018, his nomination was sent to the Senate. President Trump nominated Bumatay to the seat vacated by Judge Alex Kozinski, who retired on December 18, 2017.

On January 3, 2019, his nomination was returned to the President under Rule XXXI, Paragraph 6 of the United States Senate.

On September 20, 2019, President Donald Trump announced his intent once again to nominate Bumatay to serve as a United States Circuit Judge of the United States Court of Appeals for the Ninth Circuit. On October 15, 2019, his nomination was sent to the Senate. President Trump nominated Bumatay to the seat being vacated by Judge Carlos Bea, who previously announced his intention to assume senior status on a date to be determined. On October 30, 2019, a hearing on Bumatay's nomination was held before the Senate Judiciary Committee. On November 21, 2019, his nomination was reported out of committee by a 12–10 vote. On December 9, 2019, the Senate invoked cloture by a 47–41 vote. On December 10, 2019, the Senate confirmed his nomination by a 53–40 vote. He received his judicial commission on December 12, 2019.  Bumatay is the first Filipino American to serve as an Article III federal appellate judge and the first openly gay judge on the 9th Circuit.

Notable cases 
In February 2020, Bumatay dissented from a denial of rehearing en banc in which a three-judge panel ruled that the denial of sex-reassignment surgery to an Idaho prisoner violated the Eighth Amendment. In his dissent, Bumatay argued that "the panel's decision elevates innovative and evolving medical standards to be the constitutional threshold for prison medical care. In doing so, the panel minimizes the standard for establishing a violation of the Eighth Amendment."

Withdrawn nomination to district court 
On January 30, 2019, President Trump announced his intent to nominate Bumatay to a seat on the United States District Court for the Southern District of California. On February 6, 2019, his nomination was sent to the Senate. He was nominated to the seat vacated by Marilyn L. Huff, who took senior status on September 30, 2016. His nomination was withdrawn on October 15, 2019, when he was once again nominated to a seat on the United States Court of Appeals for the Ninth Circuit.

Personal life 
Bumatay is a Filipino American and openly gay.

See also 
 Donald Trump judicial appointment controversies
 List of Asian American jurists
 List of first minority male lawyers and judges in the United States
 List of LGBT jurists in the United States

References

External links 
 

1978 births
Living people
21st-century American lawyers
21st-century American judges
American gay men
American jurists of Filipino descent
American people of Filipino descent
Asian conservatism in the United States
Assistant United States Attorneys
California lawyers
Federalist Society members
Harvard Law School alumni
Judges of the United States Court of Appeals for the Ninth Circuit
Lawyers from Washington, D.C.
American LGBT people of Asian descent
LGBT appointed officials in the United States
LGBT judges
LGBT lawyers
LGBT people from New Jersey
People from Secaucus, New Jersey
United States court of appeals judges appointed by Donald Trump
United States Department of Justice lawyers
Yale University alumni